Central City Historic District may refer to:
Central City-Black Hawk Historic District, Central City, CO, listed on the NRHP in Colorado
Central City Commercial Historic District, Central City, IA, listed on the NRHP in Iowa
 Central City, New Orleans, which includes a Central City Historic District listed on the NRHP in Louisiana
Saginaw Central City Expansion District, Saginaw, MI, listed on the NRHP in Michigan
Saginaw Central City Historic Residential District, Saginaw, MI, listed on the NRHP in Michigan
West Point Central City Historic District, West Point, MS, listed on the NRHP in Mississippi
Rocky Mount Central City Historic District, Rocky Mount, NC, listed on the NRHP in North Carolina
Central City Historic District (Salt Lake City, Utah), listed on the NRHP in Utah